Viola trinervata, the  sagebrush violet, is a species of wildflower in the Violaceae family. It is found in eastern Washington and Oregon.

Description
Sagebrush violet is a low growing perennial herb that produces a rosette of deeply divided leathery leaves with prominent veins. The showy flowers form in the spring and arise singly from basal stems. The upper two flower petals are dark purple and the lower three petals are a paler lilac (sometimes white) with a yellow base, often with radiating darker purple lines. Full technical description at Flora of North America.

Range and habitat
The sagebrush violet grows in seasonally moist big sagebrush habitat and nearby rocky hillsides on the Columbia River plateau in Washington and Oregon states. Though the range of the sagebrush violet is not extensive, it is often locally abundant.

Gallery

References

trinervata
Flora of Washington (state)
Flora of Oregon